Ethinylestriol (EE3), or 17α-ethynylestriol, also known as 17α-ethynylestra-1,3,5(10)-triene-3,16α,17β-triol, is a synthetic estrogen which was never marketed. Nilestriol, the 3-cyclopentyl ether of ethinylestriol, is a prodrug of ethinylestriol, and is a more potent estrogen in comparison, but, in contrast to ethinylestriol, has been marketed. Ethinylestriol has been found to reduce the risk of 7,12-dimethylbenz(a)anthracene (DMBA)-induced mammary cancer when given as a prophylactic in animal models, while other estrogens like ethinylestradiol and diethylstilbestrol were ineffective.

See also 
 List of estrogens

References 

Abandoned drugs
Ethynyl compounds
Estranes
Phenols
Synthetic estrogens
Triols